The Sony Cyber-shot DSC-QX100 is a mobile device-mountable lens-type compact camera manufactured by Sony. Announced on September 3, 2014, the QX100 is one of Sony's "Smart Lens" cameras, alongside the QX1, QX10 and QX30, that are specifically designed to be used with a smartphone. Its highlight features are its 1-inch (13.2 x 8.8 mm) backside-illuminated Exmor R CMOS sensor taken straight from the Sony RX100 II premium compact camera, with 20.2 megapixels, ƒ/1.8 to ƒ/4.9 Carl ZEISS® Vario-Sonnar T* lens and a 3.6x (28–100 mm) optical zoom.

Like the other Sony Smart Lens cameras, it is Wi-Fi-controlled using an Android or iOS device though the downloadable Imaging Edge (formerly PlayMemories) Mobile application, utilizing the device's screen as its viewfinder and camera controls while also serving as additional storage medium via its integrated wireless file transfer feature.

Specifications

Technical specifications

See also
Sony QX series
Sony Cyber-shot
Sony DSC-QX10
Sony DSC-QX30

References

Sony products
Cameras introduced in 2014